Diezel Amplification GmbH is a company based in Bad Steben, Germany, founded by Peter Diezel and Peter Stapfer, that builds high-end guitar amplifiers. The company was established in 1992.

Current amplifier models

  6L6, EL34, 5881, 6550, KT66, KT88, etc. can be used.

Out of production amplifier models

Cabinets

Diezel offers 4x12 and 2x12 cabinets in front or rear loaded configurations. The front loaded cabinets come standard with V30 or G12K100 speakers while the rear loaded cabinets come standard with a Hemp cone speaker. All cabinets are now made in Germany with black grill cloth.

Bands and artists

The following bands and artists use or have used Diezel Amps: Killswitch Engage, Adam Jones of Tool, Matthew Bellamy of Muse, Metallica,  Dave Meniketti of Y&T, Billy Corgan, Nine Inch Nails, Guns N' Roses, Slipknot, Ian D'Sa of Billy Talent, Brent Hinds and Bill Kelliher of Mastodon, Korn, Wes Borland of Limp Bizkit, Mike Mushok of Staind, Greg O'Shea of The Prophecy, Within Temptation, Neal Schon, Buckethead, Dir En Grey, Ayabie, George Lynch, Godsmack, Mark Tremonti, Genghis Tron, Shinedown, Myles Kennedy of Alter Bridge, Miles Holmwood of Stereos, Weezer, Dave Cee of The Meese Commission, Warren DeMartini, The Arusha Accord, Tadashi, Steve Robello of Dublin Death Patrol and Barry Stock of Three Days Grace.

References

External links
 Official Swiss website

Guitar amplifier manufacturers
German brands
Companies based in Bavaria
Audio equipment manufacturers of Germany